Candace Allen may refer to:
Candace Allen (beauty queen), Miss District of Columbia USA
Candace Allen (author), American novelist
Candace Allen House, historic house in Providence, Rhode Island